Vajgen is a dispersed settlement in the Municipality of Pesnica in northeastern Slovenia. It lies in the Slovene Hills, north of Jareninski Dol. The area is part of the traditional region of Styria. The municipality is now included in the Drava Statistical Region.

References

External links
Vajgen on Geopedia

Populated places in the Municipality of Pesnica